Mackenzie McDonald was the defending champion but chose not to defend his title.

Kwon Soon-woo won the title after defeating Max Purcell 7–5, 7–5 in the final.

Seeds
All seeds receive a bye into the second round.

Draw

Finals

Top half

Section 1

Section 2

Bottom half

Section 3

Section 4

References

External links
Main draw
Qualifying draw

Seoul Open Challenger - Singles
2019 Singles